Rogers v. Grimaldi, 875 F.2d 994 (2d Cir. 1989) is a trademark and intellectual freedom case, known for establishing the "Rogers test" for protecting uses of trademarks that implicate intellectual freedom issues.

Noted artist Ginger Rogers sued Alberto Grimaldi and MGM for production and distribution of the 1986 Federico Fellini film Ginger and Fred, a film about Pippo and Amelia, two Italian cabaret performers whose routine emulated the more famous pairing of Fred Astaire and Ginger Rogers.  Rogers claimed that the film violated her Lanham Act trademark rights, right of publicity, and was a "false light" defamation.

The Second Circuit, on appeal, noted that, "This appeal presents a conflict between Rogers' right to protect her celebrated name and the right of others to express themselves freely in their own artistic work. Specifically, we must decide whether Rogers can prevent the use of the title Ginger and Fred for a fictional movie that only obliquely relates to Rogers and Astaire."

The lower court found Grimaldi not liable.  The Second Circuit affirmed, with Judge Jon O. Newman writing for the panel that "suppressing an artistically relevant though ambiguous[ly] title[d] film" on trademark grounds would "unduly restrict expression."  The court held that "In sum, we hold that section 43(a) of the Lanham Act does not bar a minimally relevant use of a celebrity's name in the title of an artistic work where the title does not explicitly denote authorship, sponsorship, or endorsement by the celebrity or explicitly mislead as to content."

Judge Thomas Griesa concurred in the judgment, but wrote separately to argue that the Second Circuit had not needed to establish a general rule.

The "Rogers test", so-called, has since been cited by numerous courts, adopting its reasoning to protect the use of trademarks in works of creative expression.

Notes

External links

1989 in United States case law
United States trademark case law
United States Court of Appeals for the Second Circuit cases
Metro-Goldwyn-Mayer
Dance culture
Fred Astaire